National Economic Council may refer to:

 National Economic Council (United States), is a United States government agency in the Executive Office of the President
 National Economic Action Council, a main governing body which solved the economic crisis in Malaysia between 1996 and 1998
 National Economic Council, Inc., a conservative American political organization
 National Economic Development Council, a corporatist economic planning forum set up in 1962 in the United Kingdom
 National Economic Council (United Kingdom), a UK Cabinet Committee created in 2008
 National Economic Council (Israel), a body within the office of the Prime Minister of Israel, counseling and assisting him in formulating economic policy
 National Economic Council (Bangladesh), the highest political authority in Bangladesh for consideration of development activities reflective of long-term national policies and objectives.
 National Economic Council (Prussia), originally set up by Bismarck and later theorised by Wichard von Moellendorff
 National Economic Council (Nigeria), it advises the President concerning the economic affairs of the Federation, set up in 1999.

See also
 National Council on Economic Education